The Taiwanese Ambassador to the Holy See is the official representative of the Republic of China to the Holy See.

List of heads of the diplomatic mission

List of envoys to the Holy See

List of ambassadors to the Holy See

See also
 Embassy of the Republic of China to the Holy See
 Holy See–Taiwan relations
 Apostolic Nunciature to China

References 

 
China, Republic of
Holy See